John Andrew Burroughs Jr. (July 31, 1936 – September 11, 2014) was the United States Ambassador to Malawi from 1981–1984 and the United States Ambassador to Uganda from 1988-1991.  He was a lineman for the University of Iowa football team before spending over three decades in government service.

College career

John Burroughs grew up in Washington, DC, before coming to the University of Iowa.  He played football for Coach Forest Evashevski from 1956-1958.  During that time, the Hawkeyes won two Big Ten championships and two Rose Bowl games.  Burroughs graduated in 1959 with a degree in political science.

Political career

Burroughs began his career as a social science teacher in Washington, DC, in 1959.  He served successively as passport examiner in 1960-63, Assistant Chief of Special Services Branch of the Passport Office in 1963-64, and administrative assistant in the Bureau of Economic and Business Affairs in 1964-66.  He transferred to the Department of the Navy in 1966, where he traveled the world with the Secretary of the Navy and the Assistant Secretary of Defense and was awarded a Merrill Trust Fellowship to attend the Stanford University Executive Program.

Burroughs returned to the Department of State in 1977 as deputy assistant secretary for Equal Employment Opportunity. In 1980, he received the department's Superior Service Award from the under secretary of management for his efforts in increasing the number of minorities and women in the U.S. Foreign Service Officer Corps. Burroughs became United States ambassador to the Republic of Malawi in 1981 and served in that capacity for three years.  He later served as United States ambassador to Uganda from 1988-1991.  Burroughs retired from government service in 1994.

References

1936 births
2014 deaths
Iowa Hawkeyes football players
Ambassadors of the United States to Malawi
Ambassadors of the United States to Uganda
African-American diplomats
21st-century African-American people
20th-century American diplomats
20th-century African-American people